An American Affair is the debut extended play (EP) by Spanish singer and songwriter Juan Ricondo, with production and arrangements by Sean Hamilton, JD Salbego and Juan Ricondo. It was released on 27 December 2015. The lead single, titled "Solo Pienso en Ti", was released on 15 April 2016.

The EP includes four tracks and has been dubbed as a pop record. It was made available for digital download, CD and Vinyl record. To promote the EP, Ricondo released an official music video for the recording "Solo Pienso en Ti". All of the material on the EP was composed by Ricondo.

Track listing
All tracks are written by Juan Ricondo. Produced by Sean Hamilton, JD Salbego and Juan Ricondo

References

External links
 
  statistics, tagging and previews at Last.fm

2015 EPs
EPs by Spanish artists
Spanish-language EPs